HMS Crusader was a Tribal-class destroyer of the Royal Navy launched in 1909. During the First World War she served in the North Sea and the English Channel with the 6th Destroyer Flotilla. Following the War she was sold for scrap to Thos. W. Ward on 30 June 1920 for scrapping at Preston.

References
 HMS Crusader, Index of 19th Century Naval Vessels
 HMS Crusader Battle Honours

Publications
 
 
 
 
 
 

 

Tribal-class destroyers (1905)
Ships built on the Isle of Wight
1909 ships
World War I destroyers of the United Kingdom